Stephen Bernard "Steve" Gilmour (born 15 June 1943) is an English-born Australian former politician.

He was born in Morecambe in Lancashire. In 1976 he was elected to the Tasmanian House of Assembly as a Liberal member for Franklin. He served until his defeat in 1979.

References

1943 births
Living people
Liberal Party of Australia members of the Parliament of Tasmania
Members of the Tasmanian House of Assembly